Jan Luiten van Zanden (born 15 November 1955) is a Dutch economic historian and professor of Global Economic History at Utrecht University. He is a widely acknowledged specialist in Dutch, European and Global Economic History.

Career
Van Zanden graduated cum laude in Economics from the VU University Amsterdam in 1981. He received a doctorate from Wageningen University and Research Centre in 1985 with a thesis titled "The economic development of Dutch agriculture in the 19th century, 1800-1914."

After obtaining his PhD he worked for two years at Erasmus University Rotterdam. From 1987 to 1993 he was professor of economic and social history at the VU University Amsterdam. In 1992 he was appointed professor in history at Utrecht University and since 2009 is faculty professor of economic and social history. In addition, in 2010 (for a period of five years) he was appointed honorary professor as the Maddison Chair at the University of Groningen. Since 2011 Van Zanden is an honorary professor at the Stellenbosch University.

He was particularly concerned with the economic history of the Netherlands in the nineteenth and twentieth centuries, but also with the economic history of Indonesia, with the history of Rabobank and that of Royal Dutch Shell.

Awards and memberships
In 2003 he was awarded the Spinoza Prize by the Netherlands Organisation for Scientific Research, for "putting the entire Dutch economic history on the international map and for leading excellent research projects". In 1997 he became a member of the Royal Netherlands Academy of Arts and Sciences, where he was Academy Professor from 2011 to 2016.

In 2009, he was president of the organising committee of the fifteenth World Economic History Congress 2009 in Utrecht. In 2014 he was awarded the Pierson Penning Prize and in 2016 he became a member of the Academia Europaea.

Select Publications

Books
Van Zanden has authored and co-authored several books including:

 with Maarten Prak: Nederland en het Poldermodel. Sociaal-economische geschiedenis van Nederland 1000-2000, Amsterdam: Bert Bakker, 2013.
 with Daan Marks: An Economic History of Indonesia 1800-2010, London: Routledge, 2012 (Translated to Indonesian)
 The Long Road to the Industrial Revolution. The European Economy in a Global Perspective, 1000-1800. Leiden, Brill Publishers, 2009.
 with Stephen Howarth, Joost Jonker, Keetie Sluyterman: A History of Royal Dutch Shell, 4 delen, Amsterdam, Boom Publishers/Oxford University Press, 2007
 with Tine de Moor: Vrouwen en de geboorte van het kapitalisme in West-Europa, Amsterdam, Boom Publishers, 2006.
 with A. van Riel: The Strictures of Inheritance. The Dutch Economy in the Nineteenth Century, Princeton University Press, 2004 
Nederlandse uitgave: Nederland 1780-1914. Staat, instituties en economische ontwikkeling. Amsterdam, Balans, 2000.
 with J.-P. Smits, E. Horlings: Dutch GNP and its Components, 1800-1913, Groningen; Growth and Development Centre, 2000, Online
 with Keetie Sluyterman, Joost Dankers, Jos van der Linden: Het Coöperatieve Alternatief. Honderd Jaar Rabobank 1898-1998, Den Haag, 1998.
 with Lee Soltow: Income and Wealth Inequality in the Netherlands 1500-1990, Het Spinhuis; Amsterdam, 1998.
 The economic history of the Netherlands in the 20th century. Routledge; London, 1997 
Nederlandse vertaling: Een klein land in de lange twintigste eeuw. Het Spectrum; Utrecht, 1997.
 with Wybren Verstegen: Groene Geschiedenis van Nederland, Utrecht: Het Spectrum, 1993.
 Arbeid tijdens het handelskapitalisme. Een nieuwe interpretatie van de opkomst en de achteruitgang van de economie van Holland, 1350-1850. Bergen, 1991. 
Engelse vertaling: The Rise and Decline of Holland's economy. Merchant Capitalism and the Labour Market. Manchester University Press, 1993.
 with P. Boomgaard: Food crops and arable land, Java 1815-1942, Changing Economy in Indonesia, Band 10, Royal Tropical Institute; Amsterdam, 1990.
 with R. T. Griffiths: Economische geschiedenis van Nederland in de twintigste eeuw, Het Spectrum; Utrecht, 1989.
 De industrialisatie in Amsterdam 1825-1914, Octavo: Bergen, 1987.
 De economische ontwikkeling van de Nederlandse landbouw in de negentiende eeuw, 1800–1914. Wageningen, 1985 (proefschrift) 
Engelse uitgave: The Transformation of European Agriculture in the 19th Century: The Case of the Netherlands, VU University Press, 1994.

References

External links
Profile on Catalog Professorum Academiae Rheno-Traiectinae 
Profile on Catalog Professorum Academiae Groninganae

1955 births
Living people
Dutch economists
Academic staff of Utrecht University
Spinoza Prize winners
Members of the Royal Netherlands Academy of Arts and Sciences
Economic historians
Vrije Universiteit Amsterdam alumni
Wageningen University and Research alumni
Academic staff of Vrije Universiteit Amsterdam
Academic staff of the University of Groningen
People from Velsen